Pickenham may refer to:

South Pickenham
North Pickenham